In 1994, the European Space Agency's Mars Express found an ultraviolet glow coming from "magnetic umbrellas" in the Southern Hemisphere. Mars does not have a global magnetic field which guides charged particles entering the atmosphere. Mars has multiple umbrella-shaped magnetic fields mainly in the Southern Hemisphere, which are remnants of a global field that decayed billions of years ago.

In late December 2014, NASA's MAVEN spacecraft detected evidence of widespread auroras in Mars's Northern Hemisphere and descended to approximately 20–30° North latitude of Mars's equator. The particles causing the aurora penetrated into the Martian atmosphere, creating auroras below 100 km above the surface, Earth's auroras range from 100 km to 500 km above the surface. Magnetic fields in the solar wind drape over Mars, into the atmosphere, and the charged particles follow the solar wind magnetic field lines into the atmosphere, causing auroras to occur outside the magnetic umbrellas.

On 18 March 2015, NASA reported the detection of an aurora that is not fully understood and an unexplained dust cloud in the atmosphere of Mars.

In September 2017, NASA reported radiation levels on the surface of the planet Mars were temporarily doubled, and were associated with an aurora 25 times brighter than any observed earlier, due to a massive, and unexpected, solar storm in the middle of the month.

In March 2022, a possible explanation of the auroras observed on Mars was reported.

References

Atmosphere of Mars